The 2010 La Flèche Wallonne cycling race took place on 21 April 2010. It was the 74th running of the La Flèche Wallonne between Charleroi and Huy in Belgium. It was won by the World Champion Cadel Evans.

Teams
There were 25 teams for the 2010 La Flèche Wallonne. They were:

Result

†: Alejandro Valverde finished 8th, but his results during 2010 were expunged as part of the terms of his suspension for involvement in the 2006 Operación Puerto doping case,

References

External links

2010 in Belgian sport
2010 UCI World Ranking
2010